The Statute Law (Repeals) Act 2008 (c. 12) is an Act of the Parliament of the United Kingdom which repealed more than 250 Acts of Parliament in full, and more than 50 in part.

History
In January 2008 the Law Commission and the Scottish Law Commission jointly published their eighteenth Statute Law Repeals Report, which consisted largely of a draft bill which became this Act.  The report recommended the repeal of statute law which the commissions considered "spent, obsolete, unnecessary or otherwise not now of practical utility". This Repeal Act was notable in particular as it repealed (except as it extends to Northern Ireland) the last remaining portion of the Six Acts, the Unlawful Drilling Act 1819, which was introduced after the Peterloo Massacre to prevent assemblies.

See also
Statute Law (Repeals) Act
Statute Law Revision Act

References
Halsbury's Statutes. Fourth Edition. 2008 Reissue. Volume 41. Page 1186.

External links
Records of Parliamentary debate relating to the Act - from Hansard, at TheyWorkForYou

United Kingdom Acts of Parliament 2008